WGLO (95.5 FM, "95-5 GLO") is a commercial radio station licensed to Pekin, Illinois, and serving the Peoria metropolitan area. The station is owned by Cumulus Media, and broadcasts a classic rock radio format.  The radio studios and offices are on Eaton Street in Peoria.  WGLO is an affiliate of the syndicated Bob & Tom Show in morning drive time.

History
Its original call sign was WSIV-FM, a sister station to WSIV 1140 AM. That station is now WVEL. WSIV-FM broadcast on 95.3 MHz, later moving to 95.5 MHz.

The station was assigned the WGLO call sign by the Federal Communications Commission on January 2, 1979.  

The station featured an easy listening format prior to the switch to classic rock.  Before being acquired by Cumulus Media in 2012, WGLO was owned by Townsquare Media.

References

External links
WGLO official website

GLO
Tazewell County, Illinois
Classic rock radio stations in the United States
Cumulus Media radio stations